Tworkov is a surname. Notable people with the surname include:

Helen Tworkov (born 1943), American Buddhist writer
Jack Tworkov (1900–1982), American painter